Six-String Santa is an album by jazz guitarist Joe Pass that was released in 1992.

Reception

Writing for Allmusic, music critic Scott Yanow wrote "Pass and his regular working quartet of the early '90s (rhythm guitarist John Pisano, bassist Jim Hughart and drummer Colin Bailey) perform a variety of famous Christmas-related songs, plus his own "Happy Holiday Blues." The tasteful renditions swing and include quartet pieces, some two-guitar duets and a few unaccompanied solos from the great Pass, resulting in one of the better Christmas albums around."

Track listing

Personnel
 Joe Pass – leader, arranger, guitar
 John Pisano – rhythm guitar
 Jim Hughart – acoustic bass
 Colin Bailey – drums

Production & other 
 Ralph Jungheim – producer
 Bill Lightner – editing, mastering
 James Mooney – engineer
 Jerry Wood – second engineer
 Leonard Feather – liner notes

References

1992 albums
Joe Pass albums
Jazz Christmas albums